Rose Acre Farms is the second largest egg producer in the United States and employs 2,000 people. The company is based in Seymour, Indiana, and has facilities in Arizona, Iowa, Illinois, Missouri, Hawaii, Texas, North Carolina and Georgia. Rose Acre Farms is one of several producers that annually donate approximately 30,000 hard boiled eggs to the U.S. government for use at the White House Easter Egg Roll.

In 2013 the company began a 30-year effort to refit its facilities to cage-free standards.

In 2018, Rose Acre Farms donated $200,000 for a new animal science complex on the nearby campus of Purdue University at Lafayette, Indiana.

In April 2018, Rose Acre Farms announced that, due to concerns over Salmonella, they would be voluntarily recalling more than 200 million eggs which originated at its facility in Hyde County, North Carolina. All recalled eggs were conventional eggs from hens raised in battery cage facilities. The Food and Drug Administration (FDA) investigation found, among other things, numerous rodents in the manure pits below the battery cages. It was the largest egg recall in the country since 2010.

References 

Agriculture companies of the United States
Companies based in Indiana
Farms in Indiana
Farms in the United States
2018 in the United States
Egg farming